The 1923 Navy Midshipmen football team represented the United States Naval Academy during the 1923 college football season. In their fourth season under head coach Bob Folwell, the Midshipmen compiled a  record, shut out three opponents, and outscored all opponents by a combined score of 168 to 62.

The annual Army–Navy Game was played on November 25 at the Polo Grounds in New York City and the teams played to a scoreless tie.  Navy was invited to play in the Rose Bowl on New Year's Day, and played Washington to a

Schedule

References

Navy
Navy Midshipmen football seasons
Navy Midshipmen football